The 2013 Judo Grand Prix Tashkent was held in Tashkent, Uzbekistan from 4 to 6 October 2013.

Medal summary

Men's events

Women's events

Source Results

Medal table

References

External links
 

2013 IJF World Tour
2013 Judo Grand Prix
Judo
Grand Prix 2013
Judo
Judo